Ashfall, also known as: Mount Paektu, is a 2019 South Korean disaster film directed by Lee Hae-jun and Kim Byung-seo, starring Lee Byung-hun, Ha Jung-woo, Ma Dong-seok, Jeon Hye-jin and Bae Suzy. The film was released in December 2019 in South Korea.

Plot
Paektu Mountain, an active volcano straddling the China–North Korea border, suddenly erupts, causing severe earthquakes in both North and South Korea. Pandemonium ensues on the Korean peninsula, with more eruptions predicted in the area. To prevent another disaster, Jeon Yoo-kyung (Jeon Hye-jin) plans an operation based on a theory by Professor Kang Bong-rae (Ma Dong-seok), who had studied Mount Baekdu and its possible future eruptions.

Jo In-chang (Ha Jung-woo) is assigned to be the captain of a special forces team taking part in the operation. Jo In-chang contacts Lee Joon-pyeong (Lee Byung-hun) who is part of the Korean People's Army in North Korea as a spy. Meanwhile, Jo In-Chang's pregnant wife Choi Ji-young (Bae Suzy) is alone in Seoul and struggling to survive amidst the disaster.

In-Chang departs with his team on a plane, and they parachute after their airplane malfunctions. They locate Joon-pyeong, who was being held in a North Korean prison, and seek his knowledge in finding the correct mine closest to Paektu's caldera. After threatening his dying wife to disclose the location of his daughter, Joon-pyeong guides In-chang's team to a power station, and they extract a piece of uranium from a nuclear missile. This alerts the American garrison in South Korea, which sends soldiers to stop Joon-pyeong from delivering the uranium piece to several gangsters from China.

Meanwhile, Ji-young encounters a tsunami while she was on the way to evacuate from Seoul. She manages to survive and eventually rescued by the US military, and met Professor Kang, who was also evacuating to the United States after his disillusioned feelings with the South Korean government. Due to the earthquake, Ji-young and the evacuees cannot board the ship bound for America and Professor Kang helps her, and he decides to stay to continue helping the South Korean military to prevent the final eruption of Mount Paektu. At the military base, where the US military took control from the South Korean army, Yoo-kyung steals the military documents and sneaks out to meet Kang and Ji-young at a secluded place to contact In-chang.

Back at the North, In-chang and Joon-pyeong evade the Americans and reach Bocheon, a town near Paektu Mountain. Joon-pyeong meets his frightened daughter Soon-ok, and just as the Chinese gangsters was about to kill him for failing to deliver the uranium, In-chang gives the uranium, but sets its timer to coincide with Paektu's eruption. Although the American soldiers also arrive to take the uranium, they and the Chinese gangsters flee when Mt. Baekdu erupts again, triggering more earthquakes. After Professor Kang updated In-chang about the location of the final eruption, In-chang and Joon-pyeong bring the uranium to an abandoned mine (which was the same location where the final eruption would take place). Joon-pyeong takes the bomb into the mine's depths, leaving In-chang to go with Soon-ok, whom he adopts. The uranium bomb explodes and while Joon-pyeong was killed, the bomb's detonation stops the earthquakes, saving many lives in the Korean peninsula.

One year later, North and South Korea together oversee the reconstruction of the peninsula. In-chang and Ji-young have a baby son.

Cast
 Lee Byung-hun as Lee Joon-pyeong (Chosongul: 이준평, I Jun-pyeong)
 Ha Jung-woo as Captain Jo In-chang (Hangul: 조인창 대위, Jo In-chang Daewi)
 Ma Dong-seok as Professor Kang Bong-rae (Hangul: 강봉래, Gang Bong-lae)
 Jeon Hye-jin as Jeon Yoo-kyung (Hangul: 전유경, Jeon Yu-gyeong)
 Bae Suzy as Choi Ji-young (Hangul: 최지영, Choe Ji-yeong)

Cameo 
 Jeon Do-yeon as Sun-hwa, Joon-pyeong's wife
 Byeon Woo-seok as Bodyguard
 Yang Dae-hyuk as Agent

Production
Production on Ashfall ended on 21 July after five months of filming.

Release
The film was released 19 December 2019 in South Korea. Internationally, it was released on 20 December in the United States, 24 December in Taiwan, 1 January 2020 in Hong Kong, 2 January in Singapore and Malaysia, 8 January in Indonesia, the day after in Thailand and Australia, and 31 January in Vietnam.

Reception

Critical response

Box office
On 22 December at 11 a.m. KST, "Ashfall" officially surpassed 2 million moviegoers, taking just four days to reach the milestone. Notably, the film had just reached 1 million moviegoers just the day before.

Accolades 
At the 56th Grand Bell Awards, the movie earned 4 nominations and won 2 awards.

References

External links 

 
 

2019 films
South Korean action thriller films
South Korean alternate history films
South Korean disaster films
CJ Entertainment films
Films about volcanoes
Films set in the 2010s
Films set in North Korea
Films set in Seoul
Films shot in Seoul
2010s Korean-language films
2010s South Korean films